Public Health Act of 1879 or National Board of Health Act, 1879 was a United States federal statute authorizing the creation of the National Board of Health. The Act of Congress was an appeal for a national public health organization and national quarantine system for purposes of contagious or infectious diseases discovered in nineteenth century America. The United States public law sanctioned the newly formed National Health Board and Academy of Sciences to provide reports concerning public health information with regards to the Perpetual Union or States for the purposes of;

Provisions of the Act
The forty-fifth United States Congress authored the public law as four sections sanctioning the needs for conformity concerning public health incidences, uniformity of incident reports, and a national public health organization.

Sec. 1 - Creation of National Board of Health
Consist of seven members
Appointed by the President
Advice and consent of the Senate
Not more than one of whom shall be appointed from any one State
Compensation of civilian members
Ten dollars per diem
Meetings
Meet in Washington within thirty days after the passage of this Act
Meet for special examinations and investigations at any place or places within the United States, or at foreign ports
Meet as deemed best, to aid in the execution of this Act and the promotion of its objectives

Sec. 2 - Duties
Obtain information upon all matters affecting the public health of the States
Advise several departments of the government, executives of several States, and Commissioners of the District of Columbia
Opinion of the board and advice to the preservation and improvement of public health for the States

Sec. 3 - Report
National Board of Health and Academy of Science to report directly to Congress at its next session
Full Report concerning statement of transactions and plan for a national public health organization
Plan shall be prepared after consultation with principal sanitary organizations and sanitarians of States or United States
Plan shall have special attention to the subject of quarantine, both maritime and inland
Plan for State or local systems of quarantine and a national quarantine system

Sec. 4 - Appropriation
Appropriation of fifty thousand dollars for the purposes of this Act 
Salaries and expenses for National Board of Health
Appropriation to carry out this Act

United States Quarantine Stations of 1888

The 50th United States Congress passed legislation to enhance and improve the quarantine service for nineteenth century America. In 1888, public laws were enacted by the 22nd President of the United States Grover Cleveland which established eight quarantine stations for the United States coast to coast territorial waters.

See also

Infectious Diseases of 19th Century

References

Bibliography

Historical Quarantine Stations

Historical Video Archive

External links
 
 
 

Public health in the United States